Kenneth Conboy (born 1938) is a former United States district judge of the United States District Court for the Southern District of New York and retired attorney in private practice.

Early life

Born in New York City, New York, Conboy received an Artium Baccalaureus degree from Fordham College, in 1961, a Juris Doctor from the University of Virginia School of Law, in 1964, and a Master of Arts from Columbia University in 1980. He served in Vietnam in the United States Army from 1964 to 1966 where he achieved the rank of Captain.

Career

Conboy began his career as a trial attorney, Chief of the Rackets Rureau and executive assistant district attorney for the Manhattan District Attorney's Office in New York City from 1966 to 1977. He served as deputy commissioner and general counsel to the New York City Police Department from 1978 to 1983, as criminal justice coordinator for New York City from 1984 to 1986, and as commissioner of investigation from 1986 to 1987.

Federal judicial service

Conboy was nominated by President Ronald Reagan on November 5, 1987, to a seat on the United States District Court for the Southern District of New York vacated by Judge Robert L. Carter. He was confirmed by the United States Senate on December 19, 1987, and received commission on December 21, 1987. His service terminated on December 31, 1993, due to resignation.

Post judicial service

Conboy was in private practice  at Latham & Watkins in New York City from 1994 until his retirement on December 31, 2011.

References

External links
 

1938 births
Living people
Fordham University alumni
University of Virginia School of Law alumni
Columbia University alumni
Judges of the United States District Court for the Southern District of New York
United States district court judges appointed by Ronald Reagan
20th-century American judges